101 Dalmatian Street is an  animated television series created by Miklos Weigert that aired on Disney Channel in the UK and Ireland from 18 March 2019 to 22 February 2020, and released on Disney+ in Canada and the United States on 28 February 2020. It later aired on Disney XD in the United States from 29 March to 22 November 2021. It is produced by Passion Animation Studios in the United Kingdom and Atomic Cartoons in Canada and features the voices of Josh Brener, Michaela Dietz, Rhashan Stone and Ella Kenion.

It is loosely based on the 1956 novel The Hundred and One Dalmatians by Dodie Smith and its film franchise. It is the second television series, following 101 Dalmatians: The Series, to be based on the franchise. The series is set almost 60 years after the original 1961 film, 101 Dalmatians, and follows a large family of 101 Dalmatians who live at the title address in Camden Town, London.

Premise
101 Dalmatian Street centers around a large family of 99 Dalmatian puppies whose names begin with the letter "D", and their parents, Doug and Delilah, the latter of whom is a great-great granddaughter of Pongo and Perdita. They often leave the eldest siblings, Dylan and Dolly, in charge while they are busy at work. The dalmatians live by themselves at 101 Dalmatian Street, located in Camden Town, London in the 21st century, with no human supervision as their owner Dodie Smith, an eccentric billionaire, left them her house and went to live on an island.

Cast

Main
 Josh Brener as Dylan
 Michaela Dietz as Dolly
 Rhashan Stone as Doug
 Ella Kenion as Delilah
 Nefeli Karakosta as Dizzy
 Florrie Wilkinson as Dee Dee
 Rhys Isaac-Jones as Dawkins
 Bert Davis as Diesel
 Kyle Soller as Dante
 Lauren Lindsey Donzis as Destiny and Déjà Vu
 Abigail Zoe Lewis as Dallas
 Jack Binstead as Delgado
 Maxwell Apple as D.J.
 Nikhil Parmar as Deepak
 Akiya Henry as Da Vinci
 Margot Powell as Dorothy
 Rocco Wright as Dimitri 1, 2 and 3

Recurring
 Harriet Carmichael as Clarissa the Corgi and Fetch
 Doc Brown as Sid the Squirrel and Spencer Sausage Dog
 Conor MacNeill as Fergus the Fox
 Rasmus Hardiker as Hansel the Husky
 Paloma Faith as Portia Poodle
 Tameka Empson as Pearl the Police Horse
 Aimee-Ffion Edwards as Arabella, Big Fee and Summer
 Rufus Jones as Constantin
 Bethan Wright as Prunella Pug
 Akiya Henry as Roxy
 Daniela Denby-Ashe as Snowball
 Joshua LeClair as Hunter De Vil
 Michelle Gomez as Cruella De Vil
 Stephen Mangan as Doctor Dave
 Olly Murs as Spike the Cornish Doberman
 Miriam Margolyes as Bessie the Cornish Cow

Production
101 Dalmatian Street is based on a pitch by Anttu Harlin and Joonas Utti of Finland's Gigglebug Entertainment to Disney's original animation team in London. The team developed the plot with Passion Animation Studios, which produces the series. Animation on the episodes was done by Atomic Cartoons, a Vancouver, British Columbia, Canada-based studio, while a number of shorts starring the characters were produced by Gigglebug. All of the episodes and shorts together are animated with the Toon Boom Animation software. While the show was produced digitally, the characters are designed with a hand-drawn outline, looking reminiscent to the original xerography look of the film. The creators claimed at the Annecy International Animated Film Festival that they purposefully never watched the direct-to-video sequel, live-action movies or the original series, and only watched the original movie. They often had to cheat when it came down to keeping up with 99 dogs, so there are some shots where the number of puppies go way beyond 101.

Miklos Weigert serves as the chief director of the series, with Maria O'Loughlin as the head writer and Cara Speller as the executive producer. The series had 26 episodes ordered.

Episodes

Shorts

Gigglebug Guarantee (2018–19)
As a part of the first season, there has been a total of ten shorts made. They were released worldwide, but only 6 were released in the UK, though the last four shorts have been seen on the two-part clipshow "Puppy Dreams".

In the United States, the first five shorts in production order aired in the middle of the broadcasts. The United States broadcast order would usually consist of two half-hour episodes per broadcast. The other five shorts however aired during reruns of shows.

All of the shorts were directed by Joonas Utti, written by Maria O’Loughlin and executive produced by Anttu Harlin.

Animals vs. Humans (2019)
Animals vs Humans is a series of short internet videos that are published on YouTube by Disney Channel. Each episode has the same plot, Dolly stops riding her skateboard, and would hangout with Dylan to watch a competition game known as Animals vs. Humans, each game would revolve around a different subject and both dogs would watch funny live-action videos about humans and animals. The animals would always win, Dylan and Dolly continued to chat about the subject, until Dolly gives out a "trigger word", as the pups would hug Dylan and Dolly. A total of 15 shorts were released worldwide so far, but only 4 were released in the UK.

Release
The series was originally going to be released sometime in 2018, but was postponed for unknown reasons. However, it did have a sneak peek on Disney Channel in the UK and Ireland on 14 December that year with the episode "Dog's Best Friend" and the short "Merry Pups". Disney Channel in Germany also premiered a sneak peek of the series on 15 December with the two segments of the first episode, and other Disney Channels across Europe followed suit.

The rest of the series launched in the United Kingdom and Ireland on 18 March 2019, with other countries following after. The show concluded airing in the UK and Ireland on 22 February 2020, and it was cancelled after one season.

Though the series was originally going to be released on Disney Channels worldwide, on 11 June 2019, the Annecy Film Festival reported that the series would have a North American streaming release on Disney+.  The entire series was released in the US and Canada on 28 February 2020, following the UK airdate of the first season finale. The show later had its US cable television premiere on Disney XD on 29 March 2021, and the final episodes aired on the channel on 22 November 2021.

Songs

Notes

References

External links
 
  on Atomic Cartoons

101 Dalmatians
2010s British animated television series
2020s British animated television series
2010s Canadian animated television series
2020s Canadian animated television series
2019 British television series debuts
2020 British television series endings
2020 Canadian television series debuts
2020 Canadian television series endings
British children's animated comedy television series
British flash animated television series
British television spin-offs
Canadian animated television spin-offs
Canadian children's animated comedy television series
Canadian flash animated television series
Disney animated television series
Disney Channel (British and Irish TV channel) original programming
Disney Channels Worldwide original programming
Television series by Disney
Animated television series about dogs
Television shows set in London
Television series based on Disney films
American television shows based on children's books
English-language television shows
Anime-influenced Western animated television series